James Monroe Gulley (May 10, 1939 – May 20, 2014) was a Republican member of the North Carolina General Assembly representing the state's 103rd House district, including constituents in Mecklenburg County. From Matthews, North Carolina, Gulley served seven terms in the state House.

He announced he would not run for reelection in 2010. His longtime friend and colleague on the Matthews Town Council, Bill Brawley, won a primary in May 2010 and is currently the State Representative for District 103.

Biography
Jim Gulley was a native of Mecklenburg County, North Carolina. He graduated from East Mecklenburg High School and Charlotte College (now University of North Carolina at Charlotte) with a degree in electrical engineering. He was married to his high school sweetheart, Suzanne Hargett. He had two children and four grandchildren. All of them live in North Carolina. He worked for 19 years with The National Cash Register Company where he received several years of training in computers during the infancy of personal computers. He owned and operated Carolina Computer Systems of Charlotte for approximately 22 years. Gulley was a member of First Baptist Church in Matthews, where he taught Sunday school for several years. He coached football for the Matthews Athletic Association and served on the board of directors of the Matthews Volunteer Fire Department. Rep. Gulley was an avid sportsman, enjoying hunting and fishing in his spare time.

Gulley was first elected to the Matthews Town Council in 1993 and served 1½ terms prior to being elected to the State House of Representatives. He served on six committees, including Appropriations, Energy and Energy Efficiency, Public Utilities, Science and Technology, Ways & Means & Broadband Connectivity, and Wildlife Resources. Gulley was a Chair of the House Wildlife Resources Committee.

Jim Gulley died on May 20, 2014 after a long illness.

Electoral history

2008

2006

2004

2002

2000

References

External links
Jim Gulley's Project Vote Smart Page

|-

1939 births
2014 deaths
People from Charlotte, North Carolina
Businesspeople from Charlotte, North Carolina
Politicians from Charlotte, North Carolina
People from Matthews, North Carolina
University of North Carolina at Charlotte alumni
NCR Corporation people
20th-century American businesspeople
21st-century American businesspeople
20th-century American politicians
21st-century American politicians
Republican Party members of the North Carolina House of Representatives